The 2019 Football Championship of Odesa Oblast was won by imeni V.Z.Tura Dmytrivka.

League table

References

Football
Odessa
Odessa